Hassan Mohamed Ali Wariiri (born July 1, 1943, in Mogadishu, Somalia) is a judge, currently a judge of the Appeal Court.

Background
Wariiri was born in 1943 in Mogadishu, Somalia. He is from Balad District (now part of the Middle Shabelle Region).

Wariiri is multilingual, speaking Somali, Arabic, Italian and English.

References

1943 births
Living people
Somalian judges
Somali National University alumni